Arapiles is a village and municipality in the province of Salamanca, western Spain, and part of the autonomous community of Castile and León.

The postal code is 37796.

History
In 1812 there was a battle in the vicinity known as the Battle of Salamanca (Batalla de los Arapiles) fought in the Peninsular War.

References

Municipalities in the Province of Salamanca